Karaoğlanoğlu is a Turkish word and may refer to:

Surname
 Orçun Karaoğlanoğlu (born 1987), Turkish kayaker

Place
 Karaoğlanoğlu, a village in the Kyrenia district of Northern Cyprus